The Aleutian Islands World War II National Monument is a U.S. national monument in the Aleutian Islands of Alaska. It is located on three islands in the Alaska Maritime National Wildlife Refuge. It was designated as part of World War II Valor in the Pacific National Monument by an executive order of George W. Bush on December 5, 2008, with sites in Alaska, California, and Hawaii. The John D. Dingell, Jr. Conservation, Management, and Recreation Act, signed into law March 12, 2019, separated the national monument into separate units in each state. It is managed by the United States Fish and Wildlife Service.

The national monument includes three sites:

 Battle of Attu battlefield remnants on Attu Island (four areas totaling )
 Japanese occupation of Kiska Island (five areas totaling )
 Atka B-24D Liberator crash site on Atka Island (one area of )

See also 
 Atka B-24D Liberator
 Aleutian World War II National Historic Area
 List of national monuments of the United States

References

External links
Aleutian Islands World War II National Monument - official FWS site
New monument announcement  as part of Valor in the Pacific
U.S. Fish and Wildlife Service − Foundation Statement–Alaska Unit, World War II Valor in the Pacific National Monument

Aleutian Islands
Protected areas of Aleutians West Census Area, Alaska
Aleutian Islands campaign
National Historic Sites in Alaska
Buildings and structures in Aleutians West Census Area, Alaska
Buildings and structures on the National Register of Historic Places in Aleutians West Census Area, Alaska
National Monuments in Alaska